

References

Peabody Award
University of Georgia